The 1962 Canadian federal election was held on June 18, 1962, to elect members  of the House of Commons of Canada of the 25th Parliament of Canada. The governing Progressive Conservative (PC) Party won a plurality of seats in this election, and its majority government was reduced to a minority government.

When the election was called, PC Prime Minister John Diefenbaker had governed for four years with the then-largest majority in the House of Commons in Canadian history.

This election reduced the PCs to a tenuous minority government as a result of economic difficulties such as high unemployment and a slumping Canadian dollar, as well as unpopular decisions such as the cancellation of the Avro Arrow. Despite the Diefenbaker government's difficulties, the Liberal Party, led by Lester B. Pearson, was unable to make up enough ground in the election to defeat the government. For Social Credit, routed from the Commons just four years earlier, this election proved to be their most successful ever—they would never better the 30 seats won; for example, they lost seats in 1963 despite gaining a slightly better share of the vote.

This was the first election in which all adult Canada's Indigenous Peoples had the right to vote after the passage on March 31, 1960 of a repeal of certain sections of the Canada Elections Act. 

For the first time ever, the entire land mass of Canada was covered by federal electoral districts (the former Mackenzie River riding was expanded to cover the entire Northwest Territories).

This was also the first general election contested by the New Democratic Party.

Overview
During its term of office, the Diefenbaker government had introduced reforms to social programs, a Canadian Bill of Rights, and other changes. The Tories tried to defend the decline in the Canadian dollar by pointing out the benefits to the tourism industry, exports, manufacturing and farming, and employment. They denied that the devaluation affected the price of bread, beef, gasoline and fruit and vegetables, saying that these prices were either set in Canada or were influenced by other factors.

The Liberals campaigned under the slogan, "Take a stand for tomorrow", and attempted to portray the Diefenbaker government as "feeble", with a divided cabinet. The Liberals criticized the PCs for their "reckless mismanagement of finances", the slowdown in the Canadian economy, a lack of confidence in government policies, job losses, and a lower standard of living than in 1956. The Liberals also argued that the steep devaluation in the Canadian dollar was increasing the cost of living for Canadians.

The 1962 election was the first contested by the social democratic New Democratic Party, which had been formed from an alliance between the old Co-operative Commonwealth Federation (CCF) and the Canadian Labour Congress. The party chose longtime Premier of Saskatchewan Tommy Douglas as its first leader. The new party recovered ground lost by the CCF in the 1958 federal election, when it was nearly wiped out. It won almost 50% more votes than the CCF had ever managed, but it failed to achieve the major breakthrough that had been hoped for when the party was created.

The NDP was shut out in Saskatchewan, its political base, where Douglas failed to win his own seat. Douglas' campaign was hurt by chaos in Saskatchewan brought about by the introduction of Medicare and a resulting strike by the province's doctors. Douglas was forced to enter the House of Commons through a by-election in British Columbia. Despite the initial problems, medicare proved popular, spread throughout the country, and is considered the NDP's (and Douglas') major contribution to the Canadian social fabric.

Social Credit returned to the House of Commons after being shut out in the 1958 election. While leader Robert N. Thompson and three other Socreds were elected in the party's traditional base in western Canada, the party's real success came in Quebec. Réal Caouette led the party's Quebec wing to victory in 26 ridings. Indeed, their win of 30 seats overall represented the party's greatest federal showing ever. They would never again equal, let alone surpass, that number—though the party gained its highest share of the vote in the 1963 election (1962 being its second-highest by a very close margin), it had a net loss of six seats.

The Socreds' success in Quebec was the result of several factors. Diefenbaker's poor French impaired the Tories' ability to communicate their message to francophone voters. In 1958, the PC's had successfully compensated for this handicap by utilizing the powerful electoral machine of the Union Nationale government under Maurice Duplessis. By 1962, Duplessis was dead and the Union Nationale was out of government. Nevertheless, many francophone Quebecers remained hostile to the Liberal Party. French-speaking voters had not yet warmed to the anglophone Pearson, and the controversy surrounding the new Liberal provincial government's radical agenda badly hurt the Liberal brand in rural Quebec. Nevertheless, while the Liberals actually lost significant vote share in Quebec (they scored more than six percentage points less compared to 1958), the split in the centre-right vote meant they still managed a plurality there both in popular vote and seats—the Liberals actually gained ten seats in the province, despite the decline in vote share.

In the end, despite their large losses the Tories' major saving grace was that the Liberals could win only seven seats west of Ontario; this election thereby began a pattern of the Tories dominating the provinces west of Ontario by large margins (with only occasional breakthroughs by the Liberals and NDP) and the Liberals being forced to rely on Ontario, Quebec and the Atlantic provinces, until the Tories' eventual demise as a party of government three decades later. The Tories were thus able to remain in power with the tacit support of the Socreds, as the two parties held enough seats between them to command a parliamentary majority. However, Diefenbaker declined to negotiate a more formal alliance between the two parties, something that would ultimately prove costly and result in the fall of his government the following year.

National results

Voter turn-out was 79.0%.

Notes:

* Party did not nominate candidates in previous election.

x - less than 0.005% of the popular vote.

1 compared to Co-operative Commonwealth Federation results from previous election.

2 compared to Labor-Progressive Party results from previous election.

Results by province

xx - less than 0.05% of the popular vote

See also
 
List of Canadian federal general elections
List of political parties in Canada
25th Canadian Parliament

Notes

References

Further reading
 
 
 
 

 
1962 elections in Canada
1962
June 1962 events in Canada